An outport is any port considered secondary to a main port (including a provincial one as opposed to a capital one), and often (especially) a small port built to support the commercial operations of a large port. The Port of Tilbury from the Port of London is a good example. Avonmouth for Bristol and, on a smaller and now historical scale,  Fordwich for Canterbury are others.

See also
Newfoundland outport, a small coastal community in the Canadian province of Newfoundland and Labrador other than the chief port of St. John's

References 

Nautical terminology